Sybille Lange (born 19 April 1964) is a German former footballer who played as a defender, appearing for the East Germany women's national team in their first and only match on 9 May 1990.

Career statistics

International

Honours
BSG Post Rostock
 East German championship: 1990
 East German cup: 1990

References

External links
 

1964 births
Living people
Sportspeople from Rostock
Footballers from Mecklenburg-Western Pomerania
People from Bezirk Rostock
German women's footballers
East German women's footballers
East Germany women's international footballers
Women's association football defenders
2. Frauen-Bundesliga players